Miella is a small village in the Matara district of Sri Lanka.

References

Populated places in Matara District
Populated places in Southern Province, Sri Lanka
Matara, Sri Lanka